Jules Benoit-Lévy (27 February 1866 – 14 March 1952) was a French painter and printmaker.

Biography 
Benoit-Lévy was born in Paris. He was the son of Baruch Benoit-Lévy (1821–1884) and Julie Strasburger (1826–1901). At the Paris School of Decorative Arts, he studied under Gustave Boulanger and Henri Lucien Doucet, then entered the Jules Joseph Lefebvre workshop at the School of Fine Arts in Paris.

A history and sea painter, he also worked on genre paintings featuring cardinals in anecdotal everyday situations, a theme in vogue at the time.

Benoit-Lévy exhibited his paintings at the Petite Gelerie Drouot, 23 rue Drouot in Paris.

After trying himself in various genres, Jules Benoit-Levy went to the Netherlands, and stayed at the island of Marken. He created fifty paintings that show sensitive and specific nature of these places.

More than his finished paintings, which resulted from great effort, his sketches show precise observation of atmosphere—sometimes characterized by clear, brightened colours, green or orange; sometimes grey and veiled in mist.
In 1902 he exhibited in Paris fifty paintings he made during a stay in the Netherlands, on the theme of everyday life and typical interiors.

Benoit-Lévy exhibited his paintings at the Salon des Artistes Français in Paris and received a third medal in 1895, honorable mention in 1901, and a third class medal in 1911.

In 1911 and 1912, Benoit-Lévy exhibited in Monte-Carlo in Palais des Beaux-Arts at the Exposition Internationale.

From 1911 to 1930, he exhibited at the Salon D'Hiver in Grand Palais.

He was awarded the Golden Ordre des Palmes Académiques (Officier de l'Instruction Publique)

Benoit-Lévy died in Nogent-sur-Marne on 14 March 1952.

Works 

 The soup of the squad; at the manceuvers  
 Combat a Tinténiac, près Rennes, 1793
 Examination of the Prince of T.  
 La Défense de Rambervillers (Vosges) en 1870  
 Sentry reposing, 1793
 La Bretagne
 The arrest of Condorcet
 14 th July 1789. En route to take the Bastille
 Death of General Moulin; Cholet, 1794
 Dutch Home
 Het Breistertje
 Dutch Home
 Evening; - near Amsterdam
 Good Hope Inn (Holland)
 Evening chat. (Holland)
 Intérieur
 Causerie du soir
 Paneakes at Pont-Croix
 The old chaps (Holland)
 On the dyke (Holland)

References

Notes 
Bénézit, p. 631.

External links 

 Jules Martin, Nos peintres et sculpteurs, Paris, Flammarion, 1898, volume 2, p. 25. (archive.org)
 Les Parisiens de Paris, 1901, p. 275 (BNF)
 Album "Jules BENOIT-LÉVY (1866-1952)", Pictify
 Famille Benoit-Lévy (généalogie), par Muriel Lévy
 Le Figaro, 1904/08/12 (Numéro 225)
 Le Figaro, 1914/06/17 (Numéro 168), p.5 Jules BENOIT-LÉVY president des Amis de Paris. 
 Les Amis de Paris: revue mensuelle illustrée, 1914/01 (A4,N27)-1923/06 (A13,N30), p. 374; Gallica BnF

1866 births
1952 deaths
19th-century French painters
19th-century French male artists
French male painters
20th-century French painters
20th-century French male artists
Painters from Paris
Landscape artists
Academic art
École des Beaux-Arts alumni
Anti-clerical art
French illustrators
Officiers of the Ordre des Palmes Académiques
20th-century French printmakers